REST corepressor 1 also known as CoREST is a protein that in humans is encoded by the RCOR1 gene.

Function 

This gene encodes a protein that is well-conserved, downregulated at birth, and with a specific role in determining neural cell differentiation. The encoded protein binds to the C-terminal domain of REST (repressor element-1 silencing transcription factor).

Interactions 

RCOR1 has been shown to interact with
 HDAC1,
 HDAC2,
 HMG20B,
 REST and 
 PHF21A.

References

Further reading